Centro de Futebol Zico Sociedade Esportiva, or simply CFZ do Rio is a Brazilian football team from Rio de Janeiro, founded by Zico on July 12, 1996.

Three years later, on August 1, 1999, CFZ do Rio founded a branch in Brasília (Distrito Federal), known as CFZ de Brasília.

History
Unlike of that occurs with the associations sports traditional whose foundation is marked by signature of an ata, a club-company passes the exist in date in that is registered its contract social. The CFZ do Rio entered in activity this way, in molds of law that has the signature of Zico on July 12, 1996, six months after the first birthday of Centro de Futebol Zico, in Recreio dos Bandeirantes.

The great goal of Zico with the creation of a club was give continuity to work of academies of its Soccer Center, providing to young the possibility of compete. Teams were formed in five main categories: Mirim, Infantil, Juvenil, Juniores and professional. The first game was by category Juvenil against the São Cristóvão in Duque de Caxias, by Copa Rio.

First club-company registered in Brazil, initially if called Rio de Janeiro Sociedade Esportiva. The team still competed as Rio de Janeiro, but the name had of be abandoned because already had a record similar. On February 4, 1998, the CFZ name became official and the ‘do Rio’  is added to Facebook the essence of idea original.

So as its owner, the CFZ do Rio born fated the win. The team professional joined in Third Division of State Championship in 1997 and already premiered being champion. In final held on September 27, the team headed by Jaime de Almeida with Joubert Filho in fitness and Joubert in coordination and technical knowledge, defeated Duquecaxiense by 1-0, goal of Japanese Takayuki Suzuki. Suzuki defended later the selection of Japan and was headed by Zico between 2002-2006.

In other categories not was different. Since that the club entered in activity, Juniores e Juvenil obtained results expressive. Under the command of former players Adílio and Andrade, contemporary of Zico in midfield of Flamengo the CFZ won the tricampeonato of Second Division of Juniores (1999, 2000 and 2002). And still arrived to championship of Taça Otávio Pinto Guimarães, Competition that meets the main teams of State in same category. In 2000, the team Juvenil reached the Title state undefeated while the team Mirim raised the cup in year earlier. In this same years, Zico had the idea of lead the project to where there higher organization and structure in league regional. Was so that arose the CFZ de Brasília.

CFZ de Brasília
The CFZ do Rio gave origin the a branch based in city of Brasília (Distrito Federal): the homonym CFZ de Brasília. The club from Brasília was founded on August 1, 1999, in society with the company HPMA. The two clubs passed the use the same players and technical committee during some time.

CFZ Imbituba
In 2009, CFZ do Rio hit a partnership with the Imbituba Futebol Clube to constitute a club company in Imbituba (Santa Catarina), known as CFZ Imbituba. Having the mission of promote the sports as means of integration social and of achieve the excellence and the high income in more several championships played always with the goal of develop talents with responsibility.

Flamengo
In 2010, they joined a partnership with Flamengo. The club of Estádio da Gávea assign players not recovered of the youth team and professional to the team of Zico. Also is announced a lease of club to the group of investors MFD that will responsible by all the expenditure of club.

Achievements

Regional
 Campeonato Carioca Módulo Intermediário:
 Winners (1): 1997
 Campeonato Carioca Módulo Especial:
 Winners (1): 2004

Other tournaments
 Copa Integração:
 Winners (1): 2001

Youth
 Campeonato Carioca Segunda Divisão de Juniores:
 Winners (3): 1999, 2000, 2002
 Taça Octávio Pinto Guimarães:
 Winners (2): 1999, 2000
 Campeonato Carioca de Mirins:
 Winners (1): 1999
 Campeonato Carioca Segunda Divisão de Juvenis:
 Winners (1): 2000
 Copa Integração de Infantis:
 Winners (1): 2002
 Campeonato Carioca Segunda Divisão de Infatis:
 Winners (1): 2003
 Copa da Amizade de Infatis:
 Winners (1): 2003
 Copa Guilherme Embry de Infatis:
 Winners (1): 2003
 Copa Roberto Dinamite de Pré-Mirins:
 Winners (1): 2004
 Copa Integração de Juniores:
 Winners (1): 2005
 Copa Sendas de Juniores:
 Winners (1): 2005
 Copa Rio Orla de Pré-Mirins:
 Winners (1): 2008
 Copa Danone de Mirins:
 Winners (1): 2009
 Copa Danone de Mirins:
 Winners (1): 2009

Kit manufacturer
List of CFZ do Rio's sponsors and kit manufacturers.

Current squad
As of December, 2010, according to combined sources on the official website.

Youth squad

Professional players able to play in the youth team

Youth players with first team experience

Out on loan

First-team staff
As of December 28, 2010

Noted players
This is a list of noted footballers who have played for CFZ do Rio whether or not they have a Wikipedia article. Players who have made significant/notable contribution to the club are included.

List of players
As of December 28, 2010.

Statistics correct as of match played December 28, 2010

Noted coaches
The following is a list of Centro de Futebol Zico Sociedade Esportiva coaches.

Stadium

Estádio Antunes
CFZ do Rio's home stadium is nominally the José Antunes Coimbra Filho (also known as Estádio Antunes), which was inaugurated on March 29, 1997 and has a capacity of 1,000 fans.

Presidents

 Bruno de Sá Coimbra (?)

See also
Centro de Futebol Zico de Brasília Sociedade Esportiva

References

External links
Centro de Futebol Zico Sociedade Esportiva official website 
Zico official website 

Centro de Futebol Zico
Association football clubs established in 1996
1996 establishments in Brazil
Football clubs in Rio de Janeiro (state)